As of 2015, Konkani has two translations available of the Tirukkural.

Background
The first translation of the Kural text in Konkani is that by Narayana Purushothama Mallaya in 2002, which was published by Konkani Bhasha Prachar Sabha, Kochi, India. In 1987, while attending a translators' workshop organised by the Kendra Sahitya Akademi at Thiruvananthapuram, Mallaya, who was selected as the resource person for Konkani, was requested by the renowned Tamil writer Ka Na Subramaniam to translate the Kural. Mallaya spent the next one-and-a-half decades to translate all the 1330 couplets of the Kural text, which became his 18th work to appear in print. The translation was released by the former Supreme Court judge V. R. Krishna Iyer on 23 June 2002.

Another Konkani translation of the Kural text was made by Suresh Gundu Amonkar, who also translated the Dhammapada, Bhagavad Gita, Gospel of John and Dnyaneshwari.

Translations

See also
 Tirukkural translations
 List of Tirukkural translations by language

References 

Konkani
Translations into Konkani